SA1 Swansea Waterfront (colloquially: SA1) is the marketing name given to the brownfield development area located in northern part of Swansea Docks.  The area is located directly to the southeast of Swansea city centre.  It is bordered by the Fabian Way to the north and covers the Prince of Wales Dock area.

The development will be a commercial and residential mix.  The forecast outputs are 2,900 new jobs, about 2,000+ new apartments and houses, 65,000 m2 (700,000 sq ft) of business/offices; 29,000 m2 (312,000 sq ft) of commercial leisure; 26,400 m2 (284,200 sq ft) of hotel development; 23,200 m2 (249,700 sq ft) of institutional facilities; 1,015 m2 (10,930 sq ft) of on shore marina facilities.

Completed projects 
As of June 2020, completed projects include:

Offices 
 Two Swansea Technium business innovation centres developed jointly by the Welsh Development Agency and Swansea University to encourage more high-tech companies to locate or start up in the city;
 Offices for UK law firm Morgan Cole (although they have since relocated);
 Admiral Group House (née Cyprium) offices leased by Admiral Insurance;
 Ellipse:  speculative Grade A office development by Babcock and Brown leased by VOSA;
 Ethos Project offices; and 
 Langdon House:  offices by Broadhall Wharfedale.

Residential 
 Altamar: 158 residential apartments by Bellway Homes;
 Llys Hafan: 54 affordable housing units by Gwalia Housing Group;
 Mariner's Court: 79 Retirement apartments by Coastal Housing Group 
 South Quay: 165 residential apartments by Quest Properties;
 Harbour Quay: 69 residential apartments for Costal Housing.

Mixed and other developments 

 University of Wales Trinity Saint David Waterfront Campus - IQ building
 University of Wales Trinity Saint David Waterfront Campus - Forum building

 the dismantling and reassembly of the Grade II Listed Norwegian Church;
 Ice House bistro wine bar and restaurant complex;
 J Shed warehouse converted into commercial space including offices and restaurants;
 Waterfront Community Church;
 De Vere Village Hotel and Leisure Club; and 
 a dental referral centre.
 Premier inn hotel with attached Beefeater and Tesco Express. 
 Beacon Centre for Health; including Doctors Surgery, dentist, pharmacy, Swansea University school of Medicine and ABM university health board.

Access 
 Sail Bridge; and 
 Trafalgar Bridge over the Swansea barrage.

Under planning/construction 
Projects under construction or in the pipeline include:
 a private hospital; HMT Sancta Maria. 
 new lock tidal basin connecting the Prince of Wales Dock directly with the River Tawe and berthing for 400 boats;
 Discovery Leisure Quarter, scheduled to accommodate a multiplex cinema/bowling/casino/restaurant unit together with residential and student accommodation.  A multi-storey car park is also part of the plan.
 plus a range of office developments and housing.
 645 bedroom student apartment complex.

War Memorial 
A war memorial is located in the Square between the two Technium buildings commemorating the British Merchant Navy seamen of Swansea during World War II.

References

External links 
 SA1 Swansea Waterfront official website with information about the regeneration project
 City and County of Swansea Public and Educational information and photographs about the Waterfront Community Church
 Technium Swansea

Geography of Swansea
Districts of Swansea
Buildings and structures in Swansea
Redeveloped ports and waterfronts in Wales
Swansea Bay
Buildings and structures under construction in the United Kingdom